A band brake is a primary or secondary brake, consisting of a band of friction material that tightens concentrically around a cylindrical piece of equipment or EMUs to either prevent it from rotating (a static or "holding" brake), or to slow it (a dynamic brake). This application is common on winch drums and chain saws and is also used for some bicycle brakes.

A former application was the locking of gear rings in epicyclic gearing. In modern automatic transmissions this task has been taken over entirely by multiple-plate clutches or multiple-plate brakes.

Features 

Band brakes can be simple, compact, rugged, and can generate high force with a light input force.  However, band brakes are prone to grabbing or chatter and loss of brake force when hot.  These problems are inherent with the design and thus limit where band brakes are a good solution.

Effectiveness 

For example, light rust on the drum may cause the brake to "grab" or chatter, water may cause the brake to slip, and rising temperatures in braking may cause the coefficient of friction to drop slightly but in turn cause brake force to drop greatly.

See also 

 Bicycle band brake
 Prony brake, a form of band brake used for the measurement of torque and horsepower.

Brakes